St Mary's School, Worcester (also known as Worcester's Girls' School) was a private day school for girls aged 0–18 (and boys aged 0–5) in Worcester, England. The school was located at a Victorian mansion centered on a 15-acre campus. Following a surprise announcement that the school had become impossible to run partly due to recession, the school ceased operations at the end of the summer term 2014.

History

Building
The building which the school occupied, Battenhall Mount, dates back to the Victorian period and was built during the 1860s. It was taken over by Sir Percy Allsopp who extended the building, modeling it after the Italianate style popularised by Prince Albert. His family business went bankrupt and the house was sold off. It was one of many stately mansions used as a convalescent home-cum-hospital during World War I.

School
In between the wars, the house was put on sale. The Sisters of St Marie Madeleine Postel from St Joseph's Convent School in Reading bought the property in 1934 and turned it into a school. Among its early pupils was Margaret Elgar, great-grandniece of composer Sir Edward Elgar.

The school comprised three divisions: Early Years (3 months – 4 years), the Preparatory School (4 – 11 years) and the Senior School (11 – 18 Years).

Notable former pupils
 Charlotte Jones, playwright and actress
 Helen Lewis, deputy editor of the New Statesman
 Rachel Campbell-Johnston, art editor of The Times

References

External links
School Website
Profile on MyDaughter
Profile on the ISC website

Defunct schools in Worcestershire
Girls' schools in Worcestershire
Defunct Catholic schools in the Archdiocese of Birmingham
Schools in Worcester, England
Educational institutions disestablished in 2014
2014 disestablishments in England